The Copa Petrobras Asunción is a tennis tournament that was held in Asunción, Paraguay from 2006 to 2010. The event is part of the ATP Challenger Tour and was played on outdoor clay courts.

Past finals

Singles

Doubles

External links 
 
ITF search

ATP Challenger Tour
Tennis tournaments in Paraguay
Clay court tennis tournaments